DTE may refer to:

 Data terminal equipment, an end instrument used in telecommunication and data transmission
 Distance to empty, a feature in an automobile electronic instrument cluster
 Dithioerythritol, a chemical
 DTE (direct to edit), a digital video recording method
 DTE Energy, a Detroit, Michigan-based utility
 Dora the Explorer, a children's animated television show.
 Dual-Tile encoding, another name for byte pair encoding
 Directorate of Technical Education, Maharashtra, an Indian state government agency for higher education.
 Department of Technical Education, a higher education governance body under the government of Kerala, India

See also
 Down to Earth (disambiguation)